Pawawnbuk  is a village in Hsawlaw Township in Myitkyina District in the Kachin State of north-eastern Burma.

References

External links
Satellite map at Maplandia.com
Search for Pawawnbuk in the MSN Encarta atlas

Populated places in Kachin State
Hsawlaw Township